The 2008 Team Long Track World Championship was the second annual FIM Team Long Track World Championship.  The final took place on 24 August 2008 in Werlte, Germany. The championship was won by host team and the defending champion Germany who beat Netherlands in a final heat. Great Britain finished third.

Results
  Werlte "Hümmlingring-Arena" (Length: 541 m)
 24 August 2008 (13:00 UTC+1)
 Referee:  Wojciech Grodzki
 Jury President:  Janos Nadasdi

Heat details

See also
 2008 Individual Long Track World Championship
 2008 Speedway World Cup

References

Team Long Track World Championship
Team Long Track World Championship, 2008
Longtrack
Longtrack
2000s in Lower Saxony